Wawrzęcice  is a village in the administrative district of Gmina Wiązów, within Strzelin County, Lower Silesian Voivodeship, in south-western Poland.

References

Villages in Strzelin County